The National Championship Foundation (NCF) was established by Mike Riter of Hudson, New York.  The NCF retroactively selected  college football national champions for each year from 1869 to 1979, and its selections are among the historic national champions recognized by the National Collegiate Athletic Association (NCAA) in its Football Bowl Subdivision record book.

Champions
The following list identifies the college football national champions as selected by the National Championship Foundation.

See also
NCAA Division I FBS national football championship

References

College football championships